More than 99.5% of Colombians speak  the Spanish language; also 65 Amerindian languages, 2 Creole languages, the Portuguese language and the Romani language are spoken in the country. English has official status in the San Andrés, Providencia and Santa Catalina Islands.

The overwhelming majority of Colombians speak Spanish (see also Colombian Spanish), but in total 90 languages are listed for Colombia in the Ethnologue database. The specific number of spoken languages varies slightly since some authors consider as different languages what others consider to be varieties or dialects of the same language. Best estimates recorded 71 languages that are spoken in-country today—most of which belong to the Chibchan, Tucanoan, Bora–Witoto, Guajiboan, Arawakan, Cariban, Barbacoan, and Saliban language families. There are currently about 850,000 speakers of native languages.

Sixty-five indigenous languages that exist today can be regrouped into 12 language families and 10 language isolates, not yet classified.

The languages are: the great linguistic family Chibchan, of probable Central American origin; the great South American families Arawakan, Cariban, Quechuan and Tupian; seven families only present at the regional level (Chocó, Guahibo, Saliba, Nadahup, Witoto, Bora, Tucano). The ten isolated languages are: Andoque, Awa Pit, Cofán, Misak, Kamentsá, Páez, Ticuna, Tinigua, Yagua, Yaruro.

There are also two Creole languages spoken in the country. The first is San Andrés Creole, which is spoken alongside English in the San Andrés, Providencia, and Catalina insular regions of Colombia. It is related to and mutually intelligible with many other English-based Creole languages (also known as Patois/Patwa) spoken in West Indian and Caribbean islands, although San Andres Creole (which is also sometimes called Saint Andrewan or Bende) has had more Spanish influence. San Andrés Creole is also very similar to the creole languages spoken on the Caribbean coasts of Nicaragua and Costa Rica, leading some linguists to conclude that they are dialects of the same language.

The second Creole language is called Palenquero. During the days of Spanish colonization, hundreds of thousands of African slaves were brought to Colombia via the Atlantic Coast. Some of these slaves were able to escape, and many of them fled inland and created walled cities known as palenques. Some of these palenques grew very large, holding hundreds of people, and they all developed their own creole languages, developing similarly to Haitian Creole. In the early 1600s, the King of Spain began sending his armies to crush the palenques and send their inhabitants to slavery. Most of the palenques fell, and their languages went extinct, but with one exception: San Basilio de Palenque. San Basilio successfully repelled Spanish attacks for almost 100 years, until 1721, when it was declared a Free City. Any slave who ran away and successfully made it to San Basilio was considered a free man. The creole language spoken in San Basilio de Palenque is called Palenquero and it has survived to this day. It is still spoken in the city of San Basilio as well as in a few neighborhoods of the nearby major city of Cartagena.

Classification 

Some 80 languages of Colombia, grouped into 11 families are classified. Also appear isolated or unclassified languages. Extinct languages are indicated by the sign (†).

Sign languages
 Colombian Sign Language
 Providence Island Sign Language

See also 

 Antioquian languages
 Colombian Spanish

References